On 23 October 2022, Storm Beatrice spawned multiple severe thunderstorms across parts of Europe, including tornadic supercells in parts of France and embedded circulations in the mesoscale convective system that impacted parts of England. Eleven tornadoes were confirmed as a result of the outbreak, some of which were strong and caused major damage. 4 F1 tornadoes and 1 F2 tornado struck Hampshire and Greater London. The most severe damage from the F3 tornado occurred in Bihucourt, where numerous brick homes and other buildings had roofs torn off and exterior walls collapsed. The Bihucourt tornado eventually crossed into Belgium before dissipating, and was the strongest tornado in France since an F3 tornado caused significant damage near Étrochey on June 19, 2013. One of the F2 tornadoes struck Beuzeville while the other impacted Songeons, with significant damage occurring in both towns. In addition to the tornadoes, numerous reports of flooding, hail, and damaging straight-line winds were also received. Despite the severity of the damage, no fatalities occurred as a result of the tornadoes, though a few injuries were reported.

Tornadoes

October 23 event

Belleuse-Bihucourt, France/Leuze-en-Hainaut, Belgium 

An intense, destructive, and very long-tracked EF3/F3/IF3/T6 tornado caused major damage in multiple localities in France, before crossing into Belgium and causing additional damage there before dissipating. The tornado first struck Belleuse, where trees were downed and roughly a dozen buildings were damaged. The tornado then impacted Conty, where many homes and masonry buildings were unroofed, brick garden walls were toppled, and streets were left covered in debris. 80 homes were damaged in Conty, and 10 were left uninhabitable, while a school, gymnasium, post office, and a sawmill were damaged as well. The tornado moved through rural areas outside of Amiens and Albert before reaching peak intensity and striking Bihucourt. Numerous well-built brick homes and other buildings in town were severely damaged and had their roofs torn off, and several sustained total collapse of multiple exterior walls. Large trees were snapped and debranched, cars were tossed, a church was damaged, and debris was scattered throughout Bihucourt, where 90 homes were damaged, 48 of which were left uninhabitable. Metal-framed outbuildings were destroyed outside of town, and large round hay bales were thrown. The tornado then weakened but still caused extensive damage as it moved through Hendecourt-lès-Cagnicourt, where trees were downed and 50 homes and farms were damaged in and around town. Considerable roof damage occurred in Arleux, and many trees were downed near Erchin before the tornado struck Masny, where 50 homes were damaged, some significantly. 10 administrative buildings were also damaged in town, along with a school and two sports halls. Continuing through Warlaing, the tornado snapped and uprooted trees, and tore large sections of roofing from buildings in town before crossing into Belgium. There, it inflicted roof and window damage to homes and other buildings in the small villages of Braffe and Willaupuis. A small brick chapel near Willapuis was largely destroyed, and trees and farms near both communities were also damaged. The tornado eventually dissipated near Leuze-en-Hainaut in the small community of Blicquy. Minor injuries were reported. This was the longest-tracked tornado in the history of France.

See also 
 Storm Beatrice – The European Windstorm responsible for creating the tornado outbreak
 2021 South Moravia tornado
 2008 Hautmont tornado – A tornado rated F4 in the same region
 List of European tornadoes and tornado outbreaks
 Tornadoes of 2022

References 

2022 meteorology
2022 in France
Tornadoes of 2022
Tornadoes in France
Tornadoes in the United Kingdom
2022 disasters in the United Kingdom